The Enna is a stream in the Bergamo Alps of northern Italy. It begins near Morterone, cuts through the Val Taleggio, passes near the village of Taleggio, and after  flows into the Brembo river at San Giovanni Bianco.

The Enna cuts a gorge called the Orrido della Val Taleggio.

Rivers of Italy
Rivers of the Province of Bergamo